Kopacz may refer to:

 Kopacz, Lower Silesian Voivodeship, a village in Lower Silesian Voivodeship, south-west Poland
 Kopacz (surname)
 the Kopacz coat of arms

See also